This list of mountain and hill ranges in Germany contains a selection of the main mountain and hill regions in Germany.

In addition the list shows the highest (German) mountain in the range together with its height above sea level (taken as Normalnull (NN)) and the state in which its highest elevation is located. If the highest feature extends into neighbouring states, it is possible, that there are higher summits located there.

The same hill or mountain may be listed more than once; for example the Zugspitze, Germany’s highest mountain, belongs to the Alps, the Bavarian Alps, the Northern Limestone Alps and the Wetterstein Mountains.

The ranges are listed in alphabetical order.

See also 
 Mountain
 List of the highest mountains in Germany
 List of the highest mountains in Austria
 List of mountains in Switzerland
 Eight-thousander
 List of the highest mountains in the continents

 01
Germany, List of mountain ranges of
 
 
Mountain and hill ranges